Olomouc Zoo, (Zoologická zahrada Olomouc) is a Czech zoo,  located in Svatý Kopeček, Olomouc in Czech Republic.

Olomouc Zoo is one of the largest breeders of South African Gemsbok in Europe and the stud book keeper of the East Caucasian tur

References

External links

Zoos in the Czech Republic
Buildings and structures in Olomouc
Zoos established in 1956
1956 establishments in Czechoslovakia
20th-century architecture in the Czech Republic